Child's Play is a 2019 horror film directed by Lars Klevberg from a screenplay written by Tyler Burton Smith. Serving both as a remake of the 1988 film of the same name and a reboot of the Child's Play franchise, the film stars Aubrey Plaza, Gabriel Bateman, Brian Tyree Henry, and Mark Hamill as the voice of Chucky. It follows a family terrorized by a high-tech doll who develops self-awareness and becomes subsequently hostile and murderous.

Plans for a Child's Play remake began in the early 2010s, with original Chucky voice actor Brad Dourif set to reprise the role. However, it was turned down and the project entered development hell. By 2018, Metro-Goldwyn-Mayer announced a remake with a different creative team than the original film series. Klevberg signed on as director from a script by Burton Smith, saying in an interview he drew inspiration from the 1982 science fiction film, E.T. the Extra-Terrestrial. Principal photography for the film began in September 2018 and wrapped in November in Vancouver, British Columbia.

Child's Play was theatrically released in the United States on June 21, 2019, by Orion Pictures through United Artists Releasing. The film grossed $45 million worldwide against a $10 million budget, with the Rotten Tomatoes' critical consensus calling it "predictably gruesome" and "generally entertaining".

Plot 
Multinational Kaslan Corporation has just launched Buddi, a revolutionary line of high-tech dolls designed to be lifelong companions to their owners, learning from their surroundings, and acting accordingly via artificial intelligence, quickly becoming a worldwide success. At a Kaslan assembly factory in Vietnam, an overworked employee is fired by his supervisor for unsatisfactory performance. In retaliation, he sabotages the Buddi doll that he is assembling by disabling all of its safety protocols before committing suicide. The doll is packaged alongside others for its international delivery.

In Chicago, widowed retail clerk Karen Barclay and her twelve-year-old hearing-impaired son Andy have moved into a new apartment. In an attempt to cheer Andy up about the relocation and the presence of her new boyfriend Shane, Karen blackmails her boss to procure a Buddi doll, giving it to Andy as an early birthday gift. It is revealed to be the tampered one. Once activated, the doll names himself "Chucky" and becomes attached to Andy. Over time, Chucky helps him to befriend two other children, Falyn and Pugg, but also begins to display violent tendencies. He tries to strangle the Barclays' cat after it scratches Andy and, while he and his friends gleefully watch The Texas Chainsaw Massacre 2, Chucky starts mimicking the violence, approaching the trio with a kitchen knife before Andy disarms him.

When Andy arrives home the next morning, he finds that his cat is dead. Chucky admits to having killed it so that it would not hurt Andy again. Karen locks the doll in a closet, but he escapes and terrorizes Shane, which leads him to confront Andy. Misunderstanding Andy's pleas for Shane to disappear, Chucky follows him to his home, where it is revealed that Shane is married with children and is having an affair without Karen knowing. While Shane is outside taking down Christmas lights, Chucky shifts the ladder he's using, breaking his legs, and activates a cultivator that scalps and kills him before stabbing the body repeatedly. The following day, Chucky delivers Shane's skinned face as a gift to a horrified Andy.

While police detective Mike Norris begins an investigation, Andy, Falyn, and Pugg disable Chucky and throw him into the garbage. Voyeur electrician Gabe finds and fixes the doll to sell him in an online sale. Now fully functional, Chucky tortures Gabe with a knife and uses a table saw to kill him. Making his way back to the apartment, Chucky lands in possession of another child, Omar, and proceeds to kill Norris' mother Doreen in a controlled car crash for trying to become Andy's new friend. Meanwhile, Andy fails to convince Karen that the doll has become murderous and she takes him along to her work at the local shopping mall to keep him nearby. Suspecting that Andy is responsible for the murders, Norris travels to the mall and arrests him just as Chucky takes full control of the building.

Chaos is unleashed as several employees and customers are brutally killed by rampaging Buddi dolls and various other toys while Chucky triggers the mall's lockdown sequence. Norris is wounded in the massacre, and Andy and his friends manage to escape. However, Andy is forced to return when Chucky reveals that he is holding Karen hostage. Andy travels to the mall's storage and saves his mother as the doll attacks him. He overpowers Chucky and stabs his power cell before Norris shoots the doll down, and Karen beheads him. As the police and paramedics tend to Karen, Norris, and other survivors outside the mall, Andy and his friends burn Chucky's body in a nearby alleyway.

In the aftermath of Chucky's killing spree, Kaslan CEO Henry Kaslan issues a statement regarding Chucky's faulty programming and announces a massive Buddi dolls recall. As one of the dolls is being placed into storage, his eyes flicker red, and he smiles, revealing that Chucky transferred his self-awareness into a new body.

Cast
 Aubrey Plaza as Karen Barclay
 Gabriel Bateman as Andy Barclay
 Brian Tyree Henry as Detective Mike Norris
 Mark Hamill as the voice of Chucky
 Tim Matheson as Henry Kaslan
 Beatrice Kitsos as Falyn
 Ty Consiglio as Pugg
 Marlon Kazadi as Omar
  David Lewis as Shane
 Carlease Burke as Doreen Norris
 Trent Redekop as Gabe
 Amro Majzoub as Wes
 Nicole Anthony as Detective Willis
 Phoenix Ly as Chien

Production 
In the early 2010s, before Curse of Chucky started its development, a planned remake for the original 1988 Child's Play was announced, with Brad Dourif set to reprise his role as Chucky. There is not much information about the remake, but it was subsequently cancelled. One of the few things that were known about it is that it would have taken place around Christmas like the original film. Metro-Goldwyn-Mayer announced the development of a Child's Play remake in July 2018, with a different creative team than the original film series.

Polaroid director Lars Klevberg signed on, with a script by Tyler Burton Smith, following his work in Quantum Break. It and It Chapter Two collaborative team Seth Grahame-Smith and David Katzenberg served as producers. Gabriel Bateman, Aubrey Plaza, and Brian Tyree Henry were announced to star in September, followed by Ty Consiglio and Beatrice Kitsos in November. Mark Hamill was cast to voice Chucky, replacing Dourif. Grahame-Smith elaborated on Hamill's casting in an interview with Entertainment Weekly:

Principal photography began on September 17 and wrapped on November 8, 2018, in Vancouver, Canada. Reshoots occurred on December 15–16 and in April 2019. MastersFX, a visual effects company, took six weeks to prepare and assemble seven practical animatronic puppets, each with interchangeable arms and heads that performed a variety of required actions on set, with some help from Pixomondo, who provided the CGI for the film. Bear McCreary composed the score through a "toy orchestra" inspired by "Chucky's toy-store origins" with toy pianos, hurdy-gurdies, accordions, plastic guitars and otamatones. The soundtrack was released by Waxwork Records on vinyl which featured liner notes by the composer.

Marketing 
The first official image of Chucky was released on September 29 2018. The teaser poster was released on November 12, revealing that for the film's adaptation the Good Guys dolls would be called Buddy referencing the My Buddy doll that influenced the original character's design. A WiFi symbol over the "i" in "Buddi" teases the character's hi-tech functions, being similar to robot toys, such as Furby and RoboSapien. Orion Pictures launched a marketing website for the fictional Kaslan Corporation, ahead of the film's release. The first trailer premiered on February 8, 2019, with the release of The Prodigy.

The film's theatrical poster and a second trailer were released in April 2019. A behind-the-scenes video was uploaded to Orion Pictures' YouTube channel on May 16, which shows how Chucky was brought to life for the film. Beginning in April, several posters alluding to Toy Story 4 were released, featuring Chucky brutally killing characters of the animated franchise, using the Toy Story 4's teaser posters' background. Both films had June 21, 2019 releases. On June 24, a poster was unveiled to coincide with the release of Annabelle Comes Home, featuring Chucky killing the Annabelle doll.

 Release 
 Theatrical 
The film was released in the United States on June 21, 2019. It is the first film from Orion Pictures to be released through United Artists Releasing.

 Home media 
The film was released digitally on September 10, and on Blu-ray and DVD on September 24 by 20th Century Fox Home Entertainment.

 Reception 
 Box office Child's Play grossed $29.2 million in the United States and Canada, and $15.8 million in other territories, for a worldwide total of $45 million, against a production budget of $10 million.

In the United States and Canada, Child's Play was released alongside Toy Story 4 and Anna, and was projected to gross $16–18 million from 3,007 theaters in its opening weekend. It made $6.1 million on its first day, including $1.65 million from Thursday night previews. It went on to debut to $14.1 million, and finishing second, behind Toy Story 4. The film dropped 68.6% in its second weekend to $4.4 million, falling to eighth.

 Critical response 
The site's critical consensus reads: "Child's Play updates an '80s horror icon for the Internet of Things era, with predictably gruesome – and generally entertaining – results." Metacritic, which uses a weighted average, assigned the film a score of 48 out of 100, based on 35 critics, indicating "mixed or average reviews". Audiences polled by CinemaScore gave the film an average grade of "C+” on an A+ to F scale, tied with Seed of Chucky for the lowest score of the series.

Nick Allen of RogerEbert.com gave the film two out of four stars, calling it "nastier, more playful, and just as good if not better than the original film." Peter Bradshaw from The Guardian gave the film a positive review, with 4/5 stars, calling it a "Chilrazor-sharp and exquisitely gruesome toy story". Jeremy Dick from MovieWeb also liked the film, writing "Child's Play is the lowest horror movie remake and should now serve as a prime example of what others should do. It's highly entertaining and tons of fun, and I say that as a huge fan of the original."

Peter Travers of Rolling Stone gave the film 2 out of 5 stars, writing, "MIA is the original's perverse originality... in a misguided satire of the digital era and millennial consumerism". Varietys Peter Debruge was also negative, stating, "This is the new normal for horror movies: The screenplays have to seem hipper than the premise they represent, which puts Child's Play in the weird position of pointing out and poking fun at all the ways it fails to make sense."

Canceled sequel
At WonderCon, Grahame-Smith said that if the film does well, they would love to make a sequel. Director Lars Klevberg discussed his ideas for a possible sequel.

In July 2020, Klevberg said he would love to make a sequel, but due to Don Mancini creating the Chucky'' television series, it was unlikely.

References

External links 
 
 
 

2019 films
2010s satirical films
2019 horror films
Remakes of American films
American satirical films
American science fiction horror films
Child's Play (franchise) films
Films about artificial intelligence
Films about mass murder
Films about toys
Adultery in films
Films set in 2019
Films set in apartment buildings
Films set in Chicago
Films set in Vietnam
Films shot in Vancouver
Horror film remakes
Orion Pictures films
Metro-Goldwyn-Mayer films
Bron Studios films
Films scored by Bear McCreary
Reboot films
Horror films about toys
Films about mother–son relationships
2010s English-language films
2010s American films
2010s Canadian films
Canadian science fiction horror films